North Riverfront is a neighborhood of St. Louis, Missouri.  The neighborhood is bounded by Adelaide St. on the south, the Mississippi River on the east, Maline Creek on the north, and Hall Street, Calvary Avenue, Bellefontaine Cemetery, and I-70 to the west.

Demographics

In 2020 North Riverfront's population was 32.5% Black, 57.8% White, 0.6% Asian, and 7.8% Some Other Race. 9.7% of the population was of Hispanic or Latino origin.

References

Neighborhoods in St. Louis
Missouri populated places on the Mississippi River